Cserepek is a 1980 Hungarian drama film directed by István Gaál. It was entered into the 1981 Cannes Film Festival.

Cast
 Zygmunt Malanowicz - Vígh András
 Katalin Gyöngyössy - András elvált felesége
 Tamás Horváth - Zoli
 Irma Patkós - Öregasszony
 Edit Soós - Aranka
 Eszter Szakács - Maja
 Bella Tanay - Pszichológusnõ
 Szilvia Várkonyi - Gyógypedagósnõ
 László Horváth
 József Bihari - András's dad (as Bihary József)
 Márton Kálmán
 Sándor Oszter - Villanyszerelõ
 Flóra Kádár

References

External links

1980 films
1980s Hungarian-language films
1980 drama films
Films directed by István Gaál
Hungarian drama films